Farnaby is a surname, and may refer to:

 Giles Farnaby (c. 1563–1640), an English composer and virginalist of the Renaissance period
 Simon Farnaby (born 1975), an English actor and comedian
 Thomas Farnaby (or Farnabie; c. 1575–1647) was an English schoolmaster and scholar.